Semyonovka is a rural locality (a village) in Zirgansky Selsoviet, Meleuzovsky District, Bashkortostan, Russia. The population was 2 as of 2010. There is 1 street.

Geography 
Semyonovka is located on the Barcha River, 41 km north of Meleuz (the district's administrative centre) by road, and 6 km north west of Zirgan.

References 

Rural localities in Meleuzovsky District